Eric Walter Rothenbuhler is an American anthropologist and dean of the School of Communications and a professor at Webster University.
He is known for his works on ritual communication.

Education
Ph.D. Communication Theory and Research, Annenberg School of Communications, University of Southern California, 1985. Dissertation Title: Media events, civil religion, and social solidarity: The living room celebration of the Olympic Games.
M.A. Department of Communication, Ohio State University, 1982. Thesis Title: Radio and the popular music industry: A case study of programming decision making.
 B.A. Department of Communication, Ohio State University, 1980.

Books
 Ritual Communication: From Everyday Conversation to Mediated Ceremony, Sage 1998
 Media anthropology, Eric W. Rothenbuhler & Mihai Coman (Eds.), Sage 2005
 Communication and community, Greg J. Shepherd and Eric W. Rothenbuhler (Eds.), Lawrence Erlbaum Associates, 2001

References

Living people
Webster University faculty
American anthropologists
USC Annenberg School for Communication and Journalism alumni
Ohio State University School of Communication alumni
Texas A&M University faculty
Date of birth missing (living people)
Year of birth missing (living people)
American university and college faculty deans